Yohan Lidon (born March 28, 1983) is a French Muay Thai kickboxer. He is a 3-time world champion in Muay Thai and kickboxing - including being the first ever It's Showtime 73MAX world champion.

As of July 2021, he is the #9 ranked welterweight in the world by Combat Press.

Biography and career 
Yohan Lidon was born on 7 March 1983. He started practicing muay thai at the age of 15. Lidon resides in Lyon, France and trains at Gym boxing St-Fons in Lyon, Saint-Fons. 

He faced Eakpracha Meenayotin at Thai Fight: Lyon on September 19, 2012 in Lyon, France and lost via decision after three rounds.

He beat Corrado Zanchi by second-round TKO at the A1 World Combat Cup on November 20, 2012.

Kicking off 2013, he lost a close decision his rubber match with Karim Ghajji in the semi-finals of a 72.5 kg four-man tournament at La Nuit des Titans on February 2, 2013 in Tours, France.

Lidon then beat Steve Moxon by way of split decision for the A1 World Middleweight (−73 kg/160 lb) title in Melbourne, Australia on February 22, 2013.

A rematch between Lidon and Yodsanklai Fairtex took place at Warriors Night in Levallois, France on March 2, 2013. Lidon lost via decision after five rounds.

He scored a second-round KO win over Igor Danis at La Ligue des Gladiateurs is Paris, France on January 25, 2014.

He lost to John Wayne Parr by decision at Boonchu Cup: Caged Muay Thai 4 in Gold Coast, Australia on March 1, 2014.

He lost to Bernueng TopKing Boxing on points at Warriors Night 3 on April 4, 2014.

He challenged Alex Tobiasson Harris in a fight for the WMC World Super Middleweight (-76.2 kg/168 lb) Championship at Monte Carlo Fighting Masters 2014 in Monte Carlo, Monaco on June 14, 2014, losing a unanimous decision. 

On May 19, 2016 Yohan Lidon took Round 4 knockout victory (left head kick) over Armenian-Dutch Karapet Karapetyan and became a new World Kickboxing Network (WKN) super middleweight (oriental rules) world champion at Dark Fights 2 event in Paris, France. The knockout itself reportedly scored L'Équipe 21 KO of the year. On August 4, 2016 he defended his belt taking a unanimous decision over Danijel Solaja from Germany in the main event of Fight Night Saint Tropez.

On May 4, 2017 Lidon defeated Patrik Vidakovics of Hungary by unanimous decision making the second defense of WKN World super middleweight title in the main event of Dubai Fight, in Dubai, UAE.

On May 20, 2017 Lidon defeated Djibril Ehouo of France by unanimous decision in the main event of Dark Fights: Capital Fights 2 in Paris, France.

On June 10, 2017 Lidon faced a unanimous decision defeat against Yoann Kongolo of Switzerland in the headline bout of Glory 42 Super Fight Series in Paris, France.

Lidon is expected to fight Florian Kroger of Germany in the third defense of WKN World super middleweight title in the main event of Fight Night Saint Tropez V on August 4, 2017, in St Tropez, France.

In 2012, he took 3rd place at the 14th World Carp Championship at Lake Bolsena, Italy.

Doping suspension
Lidon failed drug tests in 2016 prior to back-to-back events La Nuit Des Challenges 16 and Nuit des Champions, and was issued with a 6-month suspension after tests on samples provided indicated a violation of France rules regarding prohibited substances (heptaminol) for competitive athletes.

Titles and achievements
 2022 WKN K-1 Super Light Heavyweight (-85 kg) World Champion
 2019 Arena Fight Middleweight (-80 kg) Kickboxing Champion
 2016 WKN Oriental Rules Super Middleweight (175 lb) World Champion  (3 Defenses)
 2016 WAKO Pro World K-1 Rules Super Middleweight Champion -78.1 kg.
 2016 WKN Kickboxing Oriental Rules Super Middleweight World Champion 79.4 kg (175 lb)
 2016 WMC World Super Middleweight (-79 kg) Champion 
 2015 I.S.K.A. K1 Rules World -76.8 kg Champion
 2014 A1 WGP Tournament Champion -75 kg 
 2013 A1 World Middleweight (−73 kg/160 lb) Championship
 2011 It's Showtime 73MAX world champion -73 kg
 2010 F-1 World Max Tournament Runner Up
 2009 WBC MuayThai World Middleweight (160 lb/72.575 kg) Champion (One defense)
 2009 F-1 World Max Tournament Champion
 2008 Steko's Fight Night Tournament Champion / WKA World Kickboxing Champion (-76 kg)
 2008 S8 WM Fight 4 Men Tournament Champion / WKA World Kickboxing Champion (-70 kg)
 2007 Steko's Fight Night Tournament Runner Up
 2006 A1 World Combat Cup Runner Up
 WKA World Muay Thai Champion
 3 times French Kickboxing Champion
 2 times French Muay Thai Champion

Accomplishments
2014 BoxeMag Best Francophone Fighter of the Year

Mixed martial arts record

|-
|
|align=center|0–0
|
|
|MMA Event 10 X-PLOSIF
|
|align=center|
|align=center|
|Troyes, France
|

Kickboxing and Muay Thai record

|-  bgcolor="#CCFFCC"
| 2022-12-03 || Win ||align=left| Giuseppe De Domenico || La Nuit des Challenges 21 || Saint-Fons, France || Decision || 3 || 3:00

|-  bgcolor="#CCFFCC"
| 2022-09-22 || Win ||align=left| Jimmy Limpasert || MFC 9 || Lyon, France || TKO || 1 || 1:00
|-
! style=background:white colspan=9 |
|-  bgcolor="#CCFFCC"
| 2022-04-09 || Win ||align=left| Flavio Fugamalli  || Fight Night One 10 || Saint-Etienne, France || Decision || 5 || 3:00
|-  bgcolor="#CCFFCC"
| 2021-09-30 || Win  ||align=left| Dolghi Constantin || MFC 8 || Roussillon, France || TKO || 2 || 
|-  bgcolor="#cfc"
| 2020-02-29|| Win ||align=left| Federico Spano ||  K1 Event 13	 || France|| TKO  || 2 ||
|-  bgcolor="#cfc"
| 2019-12-14|| Win ||align=left|  Giorgi Kankava ||  La Nuit Des Challenges 19 || France|| Decision (Unanimous) || 3 || 3:00
|-  bgcolor="#CCFFCC"
| 2019-03-30|| Win ||align=left| Artur Kyshenko || Arena Fight || France|| Disqualification || 5 || 3:00
|-
! style=background:white colspan=9 |
|-
|-  bgcolor="#ffbbbb"
| 2019-03-30|| Loss ||align=left| Kamil Jenel ||DSF Kickboxing Challenge 21 || Poland || Decision (Unanimous) || 5 || 3:00
|-
|-  bgcolor="#CCFFCC"
| 2019-12-15 || Win||align=left| Diesellek TopkingBoxing || La Nuit Des Challenges || France || Decision || 3 || 3:00
|-  bgcolor="#CCFFCC"
| 2018-10-27 || Win ||align=left| Vladimír Moravčík || Fight Legend Geneva || Geneva, Switzerland || TKO (Ref. Stop/Right Cross) || 1 || 1:45
|-
! style=background:white colspan=9 |
|-
|-  bgcolor="#CCFFCC"
| 2018-08-04 || Win ||align=left| Yoann Kongolo || Fight Night Saint Tropez 6 || Saint-Tropez, France || Decision (Unanimous) || 5 || 3:00
|-
! style=background:white colspan=9 |
|-
|-  bgcolor="#CCFFCC"
| 2018-06-22 || Win ||align=left| Karim Benmansour || A1 WGP || Algeria ||Decision || 5 || 3:00 
|-
! style=background:white colspan=9 |
|-
|-  bgcolor="#CCFFCC"
| 2018-05-03 || Win ||align=left| Avatar Tor.Morsri ||MFC 7  || France || KO (Right High Kick) || 3 ||
|-
! style=background:white colspan=9 |
|-
|-  bgcolor="#ffbbbb"
| 2018-04-13|| Loss ||align=left| Kamil Ruta ||DSF Kickboxing Challenge 14 || Poland || Decision (Unanimous) || 3 || 3:00
|-
|-  bgcolor="#CCFFCC"
| 2018-03-09 || Win ||align=left| Sergej Braun || DSF Kickboxing Challenge || Poland || KO (Front Kick to the Body) || 2 ||
|-
|-  bgcolor="#ffbbbb"
| 2017-10-28 || Loss ||align=left| Cedric Doumbe || Glory 47: Lyon|| Lyon, France || Decision (unanimous)  || 3 || 3:00
|-
|-  bgcolor="#CCFFCC"
| 2017-08-04 || Win ||align=left| Florian Kroger || Fight Night Saint-Tropez 5 || France || KO (Right High Kick) || 4 || 
|-
! style=background:white colspan=9 |
|-
|-  bgcolor="#ffbbbb"
| 2017-06-10 || Loss ||align=left| Yoann Kongolo || Glory 42: Paris|| Paris, France || Decision (unanimous)  || 3 || 3:00
|-
|-  bgcolor="#CCFFCC"
| 2017-05-20 || Win ||align=left| Djibril Ehouo || Capital Fights 2 || Paris, France || Decision (unanimous) || 5 || 3:00
|-
|-  bgcolor="#CCFFCC"
| 2017-05-04 || Win ||align=left| Patrik Vidakovics || Dubai Fight   || Dubai, UAE || Decision  || 5 || 3:00
|-
! style=background:white colspan=9 |
|- 
|-  bgcolor="#ffbbbb"
| 2016-11-19 || Loss ||align=left| Alim Nabiev || Nuit des Champions 2016 || Marseille, France || Decision (unanimous) || 5 || 3:00
|-
! style=background:white colspan=9 |
|-
|-  style="background:#c5d2ea;"
| 2016-10-22 || NC ||align=left| Gianmarco Pozzi || La Nuit Des Challenges 16   || France || No contest || 1 || 
|-
! style=background:white colspan=9 |
|-  bgcolor="#CCFFCC"
| 2016-08-04 || Win ||align=left| Danijel Solaja || Fight Night Saint Tropez 4  || France || Decision  || 5 || 3:00
|-
! style=background:white colspan=9 |
|- 
|-  bgcolor="#CCFFCC"
| 2016-06-24 || Win ||align=left| Datsi Datsiev || Monte Carlo Fighting Masters series   || Morocco || Decision   || 5 || 3:00
|-
! style=background:white colspan=9 |
|- 
|-  bgcolor="#CCFFCC"
| 2016-05-19 || Win ||align=left| Karapet Karapetyan || CAPITAL FIGHTS  || France || KO (Highkick)  || 4 || 
|-
! style=background:white colspan=9 |
|- 
|-  bgcolor="#CCFFCC"
| 2016-03-06 || Win ||align=left| Panom TopkingBoxing || MFC4  || France ||Decision  || 5 || 3:00
|-
! style=background:white colspan=9 |
|-
|-  bgcolor="#CCFFCC"
| 2016-01-23 || Win ||align=left| Ben Hodge || MFC3  || France ||Decision  || 5 || 3:00
|-
|-  bgcolor="#CCFFCC"
| 2015-10-24|| Win||align=left| Alka Matewa || La Nuit des Challenges 14 || Saint-Fons, France || Decision || 5 || 3:00
|-
! style=background:white colspan=9 | 
|- 
|-  bgcolor="#CCFFCC"
| 2015-08-04 || Win ||align=left| Jonatan Oliveira || Fight Night Saint-Tropez  || Saint Tropez, France ||TKO  || 3 || 3:00
|-
|-  bgcolor="#CCFFCC"
| 2015-07-04|| Win||align=left| Berneung Topkingboxing || MFC 2 || France || TKO || 4 || 
|-
|-  bgcolor="#CCFFCC"
| 2015-06-12|| Win||align=left| Diogo Calado || Strike Fight || France || Decision (split) || 5 || 3:00
|-
|-  bgcolor="#ffbbbb"
| 2015-04-25 || Loss||align=left| Vladimír Moravčík || Gala Night Thaiboxing/ Enfusion Live 28 || Žilina, Slovakia || Decision ||  ||
|-
|-  bgcolor="#CCFFCC"
| 2015-03-30 || Win ||align=left| Michael Badato || Caged Muay Thai 6 || Crestmead Australia || Decision || 3 || 
|-
|-  bgcolor="#ffbbbb"
| 2014-12-06 || Loss ||align=left| Michael Badato || Caged Muay Thai 5 || Crestmead Australia || KO || 3 || 
|-
|-  bgcolor="#CCFFCC"
|2014-10-23 || Win ||align=left| Cedric Doumbe || A1 Grand Prix Tournament, final || Lyon, France || Decision || 3 || 3:00
|-
! style=background:white colspan=9 |
|-
|-  bgcolor="#CCFFCC"
|2014-10-23 || Win ||align=left| Samy Sana || A1 Grand Prix Tournament, semifinal || Lyon, France || Decision || 3 || 3:00
|-
|-  bgcolor="#CCFFCC"
|2014-09-20 || Win ||align=left| Jaochalam Sitkanokgym || Nuit des Challenges 13 || Lyon, France || KO || 1 || 
|-
|-  bgcolor="#CCFFCC"
|2014-07-26 || Win ||align=left| Rosario Presti || La Nuit des Gladiateurs 13 || Marseille, France || Decision (unanimous) || 3 || 3:00
|-
|-  bgcolor="#CCFFCC"
|2014-06-27 || Win ||align=left| Cosmo Alexandre || Strikefight || Lyon, France || Decision (unanimous) || 3 || 3:00
|-
|-  bgcolor="#ffbbbb"
| 2014-06-14 || Loss ||align=left| Alex Tobiasson Harris || Monte Carlo Fighting Masters 2014 || Monte Carlo, Monaco || Decision (unanimous) || 5 || 3:00
|-
! style=background:white colspan=9 |
|-
|-  bgcolor="#ffbbbb"
| 2014-04-04 || Loss ||align=left| Berneung Topkingboxing || Warriors Night 3 || Paris, France || Decision || 5 || 3:00
|-
|-  bgcolor="#ffbbbb"
| 2014-03-01 || Loss ||align=left| John Wayne Parr || Boonchu Cup: Caged Muay Thai 4 || Gold Coast, Australia || Decision || 5 || 3:00
|-
|-  bgcolor="#CCFFCC"
| 2014-01-25 || Win ||align=left| Igor Danis || La Ligue des Gladiateurs || Paris, France || KO || 2 || 
|-
|-  bgcolor="#ffbbbb"
| 2013-11-14 || Loss ||align=left| Thomas Carpenter || Warriors Night || Paris, France || Decision || 5 || 3:00
|-
|-  bgcolor="#ffbbbb"
| 2013-09-21 || Loss ||align=left| Ben Hodge||LA NUIT DES CHALLENGES 12 || Lyon, Saint-Fons, France || TKO (Doctor Stoppage) || 4 || 3:00
|-
! style=background:white colspan=9 |
|-
|-  bgcolor="#ffbbbb"
| 2013-03-02 || Loss ||align=left| Yodsanklai Fairtex || Warriors Night || Levallois, France || Decision (unanimous) || 5 || 3:00
|-
|-  bgcolor="#CCFFCC"
| 2013-02-22 || Win ||align=left| Steve Moxon || A1 World Combat Cup || Melbourne, Australia || Decision (split) || 5 || 3:00
|-
! style=background:white colspan=9 |
|-
|-  bgcolor="#ffbbbb"
| 2013-02-02 || Loss ||align=left| Karim Ghajji || La Nuit des Titans, Semi Finals || Tours, France || Decision || 3 || 3:00
|-
|-  bgcolor="#CCFFCC"
| 2012-11-20 || Win ||align=left| Corrado Zanchi || A1 World Combat Cup || Lyon, France || TKO (punches) || 2 || 
|-
|-  bgcolor="#ffbbbb"
| 2012-09-19 || Loss ||align=left|  Aikpracha Meenayothin || Thai Fight: Lyon || Lyon, France || Decision || 3 || 3:00
|-
|-  bgcolor="#ffbbbb"
| 2012-06-14 || Loss ||align=left| Dernchonlek Sor. Sor. Niyom || Best of Siam || Paris, France || Decision || 5 || 3:00
|-
|-  bgcolor="#CCFFCC"
| 2012-06-02 || Win ||align=left| Suadao || La Nuit des Challenges 11 || Lyon, Saint-Fons, France || KO (Right Hook) || 1 || 
|-
|-  bgcolor="#ffbbbb"
| 2012-01-28 || Loss ||align=left| L'houcine Ouzgni || It's Showtime 2012 in Leeuwarden || Leeuwarden, Netherlands || Decision (unanimous) || 5 || 3:00
|-
! style=background:white colspan=9 |
|-
|-  bgcolor="#CCFFCC"
| 2011-12-07 || Win ||align=left| Gregory Choplin || A1 WCC Lyon || Lyon, France || TKO (Doctor Stoppage) || 4 || 
|-
! style=background:white colspan=9 |
|-
|-  bgcolor="#FFBBBB"
| 2011-11-06 || Loss ||align=left| Vladimir Moravcik || Muay Thai Premier League: Round 3 || The Hague, Netherlands || Decision (Unanimous) || 5 || 3:00
|-  bgcolor="#CCFFCC"
| 2011-08-07 || Win ||align=left| Akihiro Gono || Thai Fight Extreme || Ariake Coliseum, Japan || Decision || 3 || 3:00
|-
|-  bgcolor="#CCFFCC"
| 2011-06-04 || Win ||align=left| Kongjak Sor Tuantong || La Nuit des Challenges 10 || Lyon, Saint-Fons, France || Decision || 5 || 3:00
|-
|-  bgcolor="#CCFFCC"
| 2011-05-14 || Win ||align=left| Marat Grigorian || It's Showtime 2011 Lyon || Lyon, France || Decision (5-0) || 5 || 3:00 
|-
! style=background:white colspan=9 |
|-
|-  bgcolor="#CCFFCC"
| 2010-12-18 || Win ||align=left| Adil Abbas || La Nuit des Challenges 9 || Lyon, France || KO || 1 || 
|-  bgcolor="#FFBBBB"
| 2010-12-05 || Loss ||align=left| Jaochalam Sitkanokgym || Kings Cup Challenge || Bangkok, Thailand || Decision || 5 || 3:00
|-  bgcolor="#FFBBBB"
| 2010-09-25 || Loss ||align=left| Karim Ghajji || F-1 World MAX 2010 Final || Meyreuil, France || Decision || 3 || 2:00
|-
! style=background:white colspan=9 |
|-
|-  bgcolor="#CCFFCC"
| 2010-09-25 || Win ||align=left| Francis Tavares || F-1 World MAX 2010 Semi Final || Meyreuil, France || Decision || 3 || 2:00
|-
|-  bgcolor="#FFBBBB"
| 2010-08-29 || Loss ||align=left| Kongjak Sor Tuantong || TV7 || Bangkok, Thailand || TKO || 4 || 
|-
|-  bgcolor="#CCFFCC"
| 2010-06-05 || Win ||align=left| Diesellek TopkingBoxing || La nuit des Challenges 8 || Lyon, Saint-Fons, France || Decision || 5 || 3:00
|-
|-  bgcolor="#CCFFCC"
| 2010-03-25 || Win ||align=left| Berneung Topkingboxing || Planet Battle || Hong-Kong, China || Decision || 5 || 3:00
|-
|-  bgcolor="#CCFFCC"
| 2010-02-13 || Win ||align=left| Manzi Pauwels || Boxe-Thai Guinea Tournament 2 || Malabo, Equatorial Guinea || KO || 4 || 
|-
|-  bgcolor="#FFBBBB"
| 2010-02-06 || Loss ||align=left| Dmitry Valent || UKC France MAX 2010 || Dijon, France || Decision || 5 || 3:00
|-
! style=background:white colspan=9 |
|-
|-  bgcolor="#CCFFCC"
| 2009-11-28 || Win ||align=left| Lamsongkram Chuwattana || A1 Lyon || Lyon, France || KO || 1 || 
|-
! style=background:white colspan=9 |
|-
|-  bgcolor="#CCFFCC"
| 2009-09-26 || Win ||align=left| Jonathan Camara || F-1 World MAX 2009 Final || Meyreuil, France || Decision || 3 || 
|-
! style=background:white colspan=9 |
|-
|-  bgcolor="#CCFFCC"
| 2009-09-26 || Win ||align=left| Karim Ghajji || F-1 World MAX 2009 Semi Final || Meyreuil, France || Decision || 3 || 
|-
|-  bgcolor="#CCFFCC"
| 2009-08-30 || Win ||align=left| Joe Spain || TV7 || Thailand || KO || 2 || 
|-
|-  bgcolor="#FFBBBB"
| 2009-06-20 || Loss ||align=left| Naruepol Fairtex || Gala de Boxe Thai : Le Grand Défi || Levallois, France || Decision || 5 || 3:00
|-
|-  bgcolor="#CCFFCC"
| 2009-05-16 || Win ||align=left| Walid Haddad || Légendes et Guerriers || Toulouse, France || Decision || 5 || 2:00
|-
|-  bgcolor="#FFBBBB"
| 2009-04-26 || Loss ||align=left| Karuhat Eakchumpon || TV7 || Thailand || Decision || 5 || 3:00
|-
|-  bgcolor="#CCFFCC"
| 2009-03-26 || Win ||align=left| Big Ben Chor Praram 6 || Les stars du Ring || Levallois, France || KO || 1 || 
|-
|-  bgcolor="#FFBBBB"
| 2009-01-31 || Loss ||align=left| Moussa Konaté || La Nuit des Titans || Tours, France || Decision || 3 || 2:00
|-
|-  bgcolor="#FFBBBB"
| 2008-12-20 || Loss ||align=left| Yodsanklai Fairtex || Boxe-Thai Guinea Tournament Semi Final || Malabo, Equatorial Guinea || TKO (Doctor stop/eye injury) || 2 || 
|-
|-  bgcolor="#CCFFCC"
| 2008-12-20 || Win ||align=left| Manzi Pauwels || Boxe-Thai Guinea Tournament Quarter Final || Malabo, Equatorial Guinea || KO || 1 || 
|-
|-  bgcolor="#CCFFCC"
| 2008-11-29 || Win ||align=left| Naruepol Fairtex || La Nuit des Champions || Marseilles, France || TKO (Ref. stop/dislocated shoulder) || 3 || 
|-
|-  bgcolor="#CCFFCC"
| 2008-11-06 || Win ||align=left| Mohamed Bourkhis || Muay Thaï à Levallois || Levallois, France || TKO (Doctor Stoppage) || 1 || 
|-
|-  bgcolor="#CCFFCC"
| 2008-09-27 || Win ||align=left| Egon Racz || Steko's Fight Night Final || Munich, Germany ||  ||  || 
|-
! style=background:white colspan=9 |
|-
|-  bgcolor="#CCFFCC"
| 2008-09-27 || Win ||align=left| Mohammed Gür || Steko's Fight Night Semi Final || Munich, Germany ||  ||  || 
|-
|-  bgcolor="#CCFFCC"
| 2008-06-?? || Win ||align=left| Ekapon Scorpion Gym || Fairtex Stadium || Pattaya, Thailand || KO || 1 || 
|-
|-  bgcolor="#FFBBBB"
| 2008-06-07 || Loss ||align=left| Grégory Choplin || La nuit des Challenges 5 || Lyon, Saint-Fons, France || Decision (Unanimous) || 5 || 3:00
|-
|-  bgcolor="#CCFFCC"
| 2008-04-19 || Win ||align=left| Anatoli Hunanyan || World Freefight Challenge 5 || Dubrovnik, Croatia || Decision || 3 || 3:00
|-
|-  bgcolor="#CCFFCC"
| 2008-03-08 || Win ||align=left| José Reis || Steko's Fight Night Final || Munich, Germany || Decision (Unanimous) || 3 || 3:00
|-
! style=background:white colspan=9 |
|-
|-  bgcolor="#CCFFCC"
| 2008-03-08 || Win ||align=left| Elias Daniel || Steko's Fight Night Semi Final || Munich, Germany || KO || 1 || 
|-
|-  bgcolor="#c5d2ea"
| 2008 || Draw ||align=left| Alfredo Limonta ||  ||  || Decision || 3 || 
|-
|-  bgcolor="#FFBBBB"
| 2007-12-08 || Loss ||align=left| Steven Wakeling || Steko's Fight Night Final || Munich, Germany || Decision (Split) || 4 || 3:00
|-
! style=background:white colspan=9 |
|-
|-  bgcolor="#CCFFCC"
| 2007-12-08 || Win ||align=left| José Reis || Steko's Fight Night Semi Final || Munich, Germany ||  ||  || 
|-
|-  bgcolor="#CCFFCC"
| 2007-12-08 || Win ||align=left| Istvan Toth || Steko's Fight Night Quarter Final || Munich, Germany || KO || 1 || 
|-
|-  bgcolor="#FFBBBB"
| 2007-09-15 || Loss ||align=left| Steven Wakeling || Steko's Fight Night Semi Final || Germany || TKO (Doctor Stoppage) || 2 || 
|-
|-  bgcolor="#FFBBBB"
| 2007-09-08 || Loss ||align=left| Lamsongkram Chuwattana || WBC Muay Thai Presents: World Championship Muay Thai || Gardena, CA || Decision (Unanimous) || 5 || 3:00
|-
! style=background:white colspan=9 |
|-
|-  bgcolor="#CCFFCC"
| 2007-07-20 || Win ||align=left| Taylan Yesil || A1 Kickbox || Turkey || Decision || 3 || 3:00
|-
|-  bgcolor="#CCFFCC"
| 2007-06-09 || Win ||align=left| Marko Benzon || La Nuit des Challenges 4 || Lyon, Saint-Fons, France || KO || 2 || 
|-
|-  bgcolor="#CCFFCC"
| 2007-05-26 || Win ||align=left| Roberto Cocco || Abano Grand Prix 2007 || Abano Terme, Italy || Decision || 3 || 3:00
|-
|-  bgcolor="#CCFFCC"
| 2007-05-04 || Win ||align=left| Luis Reis || Steko's Fight Night 3rd place ||  || Decision (Unanimous) || 3 || 3:00
|-
|-  bgcolor="#FFBBBB"
| 2007-05-04 || Loss ||align=left| Ali Gunyar || Steko's Fight Night Semi Final ||  || Decision (Split) || 3 || 3:00
|-
|-  bgcolor="#FFBBBB"
| 2007-04-20 || Loss ||align=left| Naruepol Fairtex || Gala de Levallois-Perret || Levallois, France || Decision || 5 || 3:00
|-
|-  bgcolor="#CCFFCC"
| 2007-03-31 || Win ||align=left| Alexandros Stavropoulos || Fighting Day 7 || Imola, Italy || Decision || 3 || 3:00
|-
|-  bgcolor="#CCFFCC"
| 2007 || Win ||align=left| Tarares || Gala au Lavandou || Lavandou, France || Decision ||  || 
|-
|-  bgcolor="#FFBBBB"
| 2006-12-17 || Loss ||align=left| Farid Villaume || A1 World Combat Cup Final || Turkey || Decision || 5 || 3:00
|-
|-  bgcolor="#CCFFCC"
| 2006-11-18 || Win ||align=left| Anuchit Phutthikhwan || France vs Thailand || Levallois, France || Decision || 5 || 3:00
|-
|-  bgcolor="#CCFFCC"
| 2006-10-21 || Win ||align=left| Jonathan Camara || A-1 Istanbul Semi Final || Istanbul, Turkey || Decision || 4 || 3:00
|-
|-  bgcolor="#CCFFCC"
| 2006-??-?? || Win ||align=left| Yahooz || A-1 Quarter Final || Turkey || KO || 1 || 
|-
|-  bgcolor="#CCFFCC"
| 2006-09-21 || Win ||align=left| Prince Amir || A-1 Ankara Final 8 || Ankara, Turkey || Decision || 4 || 3:00
|-
|-  bgcolor="#CCFFCC"
| 2006-09-09 || Win ||align=left| Ramazan Beyazkaya || A-1 Antalya First Round || Antalya, Turkey || KO || 2 ||
|-
|-  bgcolor="#CCFFCC"
| 2006-06-03 || Win ||align=left| Mickael Crosta || La Nuit des Challenges 3 || Lyon, Saint-Fons, France || KO || 2 ||
|-
|-  bgcolor="#FFBBBB"
| 2005-10-22 || Loss ||align=left| Grégory Choplin || La nuit des Superfights II || Villebon, France || Decision (Unanimous) || 5 || 3:00
|-
|-  bgcolor="#FFBBBB"
| 2005-09-30 || Loss ||align=left| Dmitry Shakuta || Kings of Muaythai: Belarus vs Europe || Minsk, Belarus || Decision || 5 || 3:00
|-
|-  bgcolor="#CCFFCC"
| 2005-09-09 || Win ||align=left| Alex "The Greek" || KO Fight Night || Fermignano, Italy || Decision ||  ||
|-
|-  bgcolor="#CCFFCC"
| 2005-05-14 || Win ||align=left| Nordine Hammoumi || French Championship 2005 Class A, Final || Paris, France || Decision (Unanimous) || 5 ||
|-
! style=background:white colspan=9 |
|-
|-  bgcolor="#CCFFCC"
| 2005-03-26 || Win ||align=left| Mickael Edouard || French Championship 2005 Class A, Semi Final || Paris, France || KO || 1 ||
|-
|-  bgcolor="#CCFFCC"
| 2005-01-15 || Win ||align=left| Mickael Crosta || French Championship 2005 Class A, Quarter Final || Paris, France || Decision (Split) || 5 ||
|-
|-  bgcolor="#CCFFCC"
| 2004-04-24 || Win ||align=left| Wallid Haddad || Impacts Bordeaux || Bordeaux, France || KO || 2 ||
|-
|-  bgcolor="#FFBBBB"
| 2004-02-20 || Loss ||align=left| Majid Kazam || French Championship 2004 Class B, Semi Final || Paris, France || TKO || 4 ||
|-
|-  bgcolor="#CCFFCC"
| 2003 || Win ||align=left|  || French Championship 2003, Final || Paris, France ||  ||  || 
|-
! style=background:white colspan=9 |
|-
|-  bgcolor="#CCFFCC"
| 2003-02-22 || Win ||align=left| Wilfrid Cupit || French Championship 2003, Semi Final || Paris, France || Decision || 4 || 3:00
|-  bgcolor="#CCFFCC"
| 2002-08-03 || Win ||align=left| Andrea Brigliadori || Best of the Best 1 || Jesolo, Italy || Decision ||  || 
|-
|-
| colspan=9 | Legend:

See also 
List of male kickboxers

References

External links
Yohan Lidon profile

1983 births
Living people
French male kickboxers
Middleweight kickboxers
French Muay Thai practitioners
Doping cases in kickboxing